Napier Road may refer to:

 Napier Road, Karachi, Pakistan
 Napier Road, Singapore